Lansdown-Higgins House, also known as the Riggins House, Kerl House, and Sommerer House, is a historic home located near Jefferson City, Cole County, Missouri. The original section was built about 1830, and was a -story dogtrot house of hewn log construction. The house achieved its present form about 1854, and is a two-story, three bay, Greek Revival style frame I-house with a central passage plan. It features an imposing two-story pedimented portico supported by square Doric order columns and massive chimneys of gray limestone.

It was listed on the National Register of Historic Places in 1999.

References

Houses on the National Register of Historic Places in Missouri
Greek Revival houses in Missouri
Houses completed in 1854
Buildings and structures in Jefferson City, Missouri
National Register of Historic Places in Cole County, Missouri